Emerton is a surname. Notable people with the surname include:

 Andrew Emerton (born 1972), British Anglican priest and Bishop-designate of Sherwood
 Audrey Emerton, Baroness Emerton (born 1935), British nurse and politician
 Brett Emerton (born 1979), Australian footballer
 Danny Emerton (born 1991), English footballer
 Ephraim Emerton (1851–1935), American educator, author, translator, and historian
 James Henry Emerton (1847–1931), American arachnologist and illustrator
 John Emerton (1928–2015), British academic, Professor of Hebrew at Cambridge University
 Karin Emerton, Australian jurist
 Roy Emerton (1893–1944), British film actor
 Wendy Emerton, birth name of Wendy Richard (1943–2009), English actress

See also
 Emerton, New South Wales